Charles Arnold may refer to:
 Charles N. Arnold (1880–1929), mayor of Honolulu
 Charles Arnold (cricketer) (1823–1873), English cricketer